Tom Buford (May 23, 1949 – July 6, 2021) was an American politician who served in the Kentucky Senate from the 22nd district from 1991 until his death in 2021.

He died of cancer on July 6, 2021, in Pensacola, Florida at age 72.

References

External links

1949 births
2021 deaths
Republican Party Kentucky state senators
21st-century American politicians
Politicians from Lexington, Kentucky